Pernille Holst Holmsgaard (born 6 September 1984 as Pernille Larsen) is a former Danish handball player, who last played for Nykøbing Falster Håndboldklub and for the Danish women's national handball team.

At the 2010 European Women's Handball Championship she reached the bronze final and placed fourth with the Danish team.

References

External links

1984 births
Living people
Danish female handball players
Handball players at the 2012 Summer Olympics
Viborg HK players
Olympic handball players of Denmark
People from Jammerbugt Municipality
Sportspeople from the North Jutland Region
21st-century Danish women